The Alpsee is a lake in the Ostallgäu district of Bavaria, Germany, located about 4 kilometres southeast of Füssen. It is close to the Neuschwanstein and Hohenschwangau castles. The lake has just under five kilometres of shoreline and a depth of up to 62 metres.

Description 
Alpsee is a popular tourist attraction, given its proximity to the castles and the wild swans that inhabit the lake. Boats are available for rent and there is a wide variety of hiking trails in the vicinity.  A circular path leads around the shore, and the "Fürstenstrasse" (Princes' Road) leads from Hohenschwangau over the Schwarzenberg ridge (Ammergau Alps) and down to Pinswang in the Lechtal.

Gallery

External links

Notes 

Lakes of Bavaria
Ammergau Alps